Lee Hyung-min is a South Korean television drama director.

Filmography 
 Autumn in My Heart (KBS2, 2000, producer)
 Drama City "사랑하라, 희망없이" (KBS2, 2001, director)
 Winter Sonata (KBS2, 2002, assistant director)
 Sang Doo! Let's Go to School (KBS2, 2003, director)
 I'm Sorry, I Love You (KBS2, 2004, director)
 The Snow Queen (KBS2, 2006, director)
 Lottery Trio (KBS N, 2008, director)
 Heaven's Postman (SBS, 2010, director)
 Bad Guy (SBS, 2010, director)
 Korean Peninsula (TV Chosun, 2012, director)
 Orange Marmalade (KBS2, 2015, director)
 Strong Girl Bong-soon (JTBC, 2017, director)
 Chocolate (JTBC, 2019, director)

References

External links 
 
 
 

South Korean television directors
Living people
1969 births